The canton of Sisteron is an administrative division in southeastern France. At the French canton reorganisation which came into effect in March 2015, the canton was expanded from 5 to 15 communes:
 
Authon
Bevons
Châteauneuf-Miravail
Curel
Entrepierres
Mison
Noyers-sur-Jabron
Les Omergues
Peipin
Saint-Geniez
Saint-Vincent-sur-Jabron
Salignac
Sisteron  
Sourribes
Valbelle

Demographics

See also
Cantons of the Alpes-de-Haute-Provence department 
Communes of France

References

Cantons of Alpes-de-Haute-Provence